Willman is a surname. Notable people with the surname include:

Allan Arthur Willman (1909–1989), American composer, classical pianist, music department chairman at the University of Wyoming
Beth Willman (contemporary), American astronomer
Bradley Willman (born 1980), Canadian anti-pedophile activist
David Willman (born 1956), American Pulitzer prize-winning journalist
Elvira Willman (1875–1925), Finnish playwright, journalist and a revolutionary socialist
Hedvig Willman (1841–1887), Swedish stage actor and opera singer
Max Willman (born 1995), American ice hockey player
Noel Willman (1918–1988), British actor and theater director
Regina Willman (1914-1965) American composer
Tony Willman (1907–1941), American race car driver

See also
 Willmann
 Wilman (name)